Coryphopterus lipernes, the peppermint goby, is a species of goby found found in the Western Atlantic Ocean from Florida and the Bahamas all the way to Central America and the Lesser Antilles.  

References

Gobiidae
Fish of the Atlantic Ocean
Fish described in 1962
Taxa named by James Erwin Böhlke
Taxa named by Charles Richard Robins